The 159th Ohio Infantry Regiment, sometimes 159th Ohio Volunteer Infantry (or 159th OVI) was an infantry regiment in the Union Army during the American Civil War.

Service
The 159th Ohio Infantry was organized at Zanesville, Ohio, and mustered in as an Ohio National Guard unit for 100 days service on May 9, 1864, under the command of Colonel Lyman J. Jackson.

The regiment was attached to 3rd Separate Brigade, VIII Corps, Middle Department.

The 159th Ohio Infantry mustered out of service August 24, 1864.

Detailed service
Left Ohio for Harper's Ferry, West Virginia, May 9. At Maryland Heights until May 17. Guard duty in the defenses of Baltimore, Maryland, and guarding bridges along Philadelphia, Wilmington & Baltimore Railroad by detachments until July. Battle of Monocacy Junction, Maryland, July 9. Expedition to Parkesville July 12. Companies B, E, G, and I guarded the railroad at Havre de Grace July 28 to August 13. Ordered home August 13.

Casualties
The regiment lost a total of 10 enlisted men during service, all due to disease.

Commanders
 Colonel Lyman J. Jackson
 Captain Edward H. Leib - commanded detachment at the battle of Monocacy

See also

 List of Ohio Civil War units
 Ohio in the Civil War

References
 Bell, Samuel McCoy. One Hundred Days' Service: The Civil War Diary of Samuel McCoy Bell (Ann Arbor, MI:  s.n.), 1995.
 Dyer, Frederick H. A Compendium of the War of the Rebellion (Des Moines, IA:  Dyer Pub. Co.), 1908.
 Ohio Roster Commission. Official Roster of the Soldiers of the State of Ohio in the War on the Rebellion, 1861–1865, Compiled Under the Direction of the Roster Commission (Akron, OH: Werner Co.), 1886–1895.
 Reid, Whitelaw. Ohio in the War: Her Statesmen, Her Generals, and Soldiers (Cincinnati, OH: Moore, Wilstach, & Baldwin), 1868. 
Attribution

External links
 Ohio in the Civil War: 159th Ohio Volunteer Infantry by Larry Stevens

Military units and formations established in 1864
Military units and formations disestablished in 1864
1864 disestablishments in Ohio
Units and formations of the Union Army from Ohio
1864 establishments in Ohio